Wasatch Elementary may refer to any of several primary schools in the state of Utah:

Wasatch Elementary (Ogden, Utah), Ogden City School District
Wasatch Elementary School (Provo, Utah), Provo School District
Wasatch Elementary School (Salt Lake City, Utah), Salt Lake City School District